Kangdong County, is one of Pyongyang's two suburban counties. In 1983 it was separated from South P'yongan Province and assumed direct governance by the Pyongyang City People's Committee. It is bordered by Sŏngch'ŏn-gun (Songchon County), South P'yongan in the north and east, Sŭngho-guyŏk (Sungho District) from the south and the Taedong River from the west.

Kangdong-gun is best known as the location of the supposed Tomb of King Tangun, the Revolutionary Site at Ponghwa-ri. Kim Jong-un's Kangdong Residence is located near the banks of Taedong River. The northeastern part of the county hosts the offices and facilities of the Second Economic Committee, which is the DPRK's weapons industry. Kyo-hwa-so No. 4 is a large reeducation camp in the south eastern part of Kangdong-gun.

Administrative divisions

Kangdong County is divided into 1 ŭp (town), 6  (workers' districts) and 16 ri (villages):

References

Districts of Pyongyang
Counties of North Korea